Setmurthy is a civil parish in the Borough of Allerdale in Cumbria, England.  It contains nine listed buildings that are recorded in the National Heritage List for England.  Of these, one is listed at Grade II*, the middle of the three grades, and the others are at Grade II, the lowest grade. The parish is almost entirely rural, and the listed buildings consist of a country house and associated structures, farmhouses and farm buildings, a church, and a bridge.

Key

Buildings

References

Citations

Sources

Lists of listed buildings in Cumbria